Galveston Bay is a bay in the western Gulf of Mexico along the upper coast of Texas. It is the seventh-largest estuary in the United States, and the largest of seven major estuaries along the Texas Gulf Coast. It is connected to the Gulf of Mexico and is surrounded by sub-tropical marshes and prairies on the mainland. The water in the bay is a complex mixture of sea water and fresh water, which supports a wide variety of marine life.

The bay has played a significant role in the history of Texas. Galveston Island is home to the city of Galveston, the earliest major settlement in southeast Texas and the state's largest city toward the end of the nineteenth century. While a  devastating hurricane in 1900 hastened Galveston's decline, the subsequent rise of Houston as a major trade center, facilitated by the dredging of the Houston Ship Channel across the western half of the bay, ensured the bay's continued economic importance.

Today, Galveston Bay is encompassed by Greater Houston, the fifth-largest metropolitan area in the United States. The Port of Houston, which has facilities spread across the northwestern section of the bay, is the second-busiest port in the nation by overall tonnage. Other major ports utilizing the bay include the Port of Texas City and the Port of Galveston. With its diverse marine life, Galveston Bay also produces more seafood than any estuary in the United States except the Chesapeake.

History

The Gulf Coast gained its present configuration during the most recent glacial period approximately 18 ka (thousands of years ago). As the glacial period came to a close, rising sea levels initially filled this narrow canyon, followed by the broad lowlands of present-day Trinity Bay. Rapid sea level rise between 7.7 and 5.5 ka shifted the Gulf coastline northward to its contemporary latitude. This was quickly followed by the formation of Galveston Island (5.5 ka), a barrier island, and Bolivar Peninsula (2.5 ka), which began as a spit.

Human settlement in what is now Texas began at least 10 ka following migrations into the Americas from Asia during the last ice age. The first substantial settlements in the area are believed to have been made by the Karankawa and Atakapan tribes, who lived throughout the Gulf Coast region.

Though several Spanish expeditions charted the Gulf Coast, it was explorer José Antonio de Evia who in 1785 gave the bay and the island the name Gálvezton in honor of Spanish viceroy Bernardo de Gálvez. Louis Aury established a naval base at the harbor in 1816 to support the Mexican War of Independence. When he abandoned the base, it was then taken over by pirate Jean Lafitte, who temporarily transformed Galveston Island and the bay into a haven for outlaws before being ousted by the United States Navy. Following its independence from Spain, the new nation of Mexico claimed Texas as part of its territory. Settlements were established around the bay, including Galveston, Anahuac, Lynchburg, and San Jacinto. Following growing unrest, Texas revolted and gained independence in 1836 at the Battle of San Jacinto, near the bay along the San Jacinto River. The new Republic of Texas grew rapidly and joined the United States in 1845.

After the election of Abraham Lincoln in 1860, residents of Galveston strongly supported secession and sided with the Confederacy as the Civil War broke out. However, separation from the Union did not last long; the city's harbor was blockaded by the federal navy starting in July 1861, followed by a full-scale occupation after the Battle of Galveston Harbor in October 1862. However, at the Battle of Galveston in January 1863, a small Confederate force managed to overwhelm the Union's naval forces in the bay and retake the island. Despite this victory, the Union continued to blockade the outlets of Galveston Bay until the end of the war. Reconstruction was swift in southeast Texas. Ranching interests were major economic drivers on the mainland in the 19th century. The city of Galveston became a major U.S. commercial center for shipping cotton, leather products, cattle, and other goods produced in the growing state. Railroads were built around the shore and new communities continued to emerge.

The Galveston Hurricane of 1900 devastated the city of Galveston and heavily damaged communities around the bay. Growth moved inland to Houston, as fear of the risks posed by establishing businesses at Galveston limited the island's ability to compete. Texas City emerged as another important port in the area. The Texas oil boom began in 1901, and by 1915 oil production by the bay was fully underway. Oil wells and refineries quickly developed throughout the area. After frozen transport became available in the 1920s, commercial fishing developed as a substantial industry, producing particularly oysters, finfish, and, later, shrimp. By the end of the 1930s, the Port of Houston was the largest cotton port and third largest port by overall tonnage in the United States.

The establishment of NASA's Johnson Space Center near the bay in the Clear Lake Area in 1963 brought new growth. By the 1970s Houston had become one of the nation's largest cities, and its expansion connected it with the bay communities. The bay's shoreline became heavily urbanized and industrialized, leading to pollution of the bay. In the 1970s the bay was described by U.S. Representative Robert C. Eckhardt as "the most polluted body of water in the U.S." The ship channel and Clear Lake were rated by the Galveston Bay Estuary Program as having even worse water quality.

Extraction of oil and groundwater, as well as large wakes from increasing shipping in the bay, led to land subsidence and erosion along the shoreline, especially in the Baytown–Pasadena area. On February 23, 2019, Atlas Air Flight 3591 crashed into Trinity Bay, one of the bay's extensions, killing all three people on board. Today, the bay is a major destination for recreational and tourist activities, including boating, ecotourism, and waterfowl hunting.

Features

The Galveston Bay system consists of four main bodies of water: Galveston Bay proper (upper and lower), Trinity Bay, East Bay, and West Bay. The bay is bordered by three counties: Chambers, Harris, and Galveston. Significant communities around the bay include Houston, Pasadena, League City, Baytown, Texas City, Galveston, La Porte, Seabrook, and Anahuac.

Galveston Bay has three outlets to the Gulf of Mexico: Bolivar Roads between Galveston Island and the Bolivar Peninsula, San Luis Pass at the west end of Galveston Island, and Rollover Pass across Bolivar Peninsula. Many smaller bays and lakes are connected to the main system, including Christmas Bay, Moses Lake, Dickinson Bay, Clear Lake, Ash Lake, Black Duck Bay, and San Jacinto Bay. Together with its extensions, Galveston Bay forms the largest of the seven major estuaries along the Gulf Coast of Texas. The Gulf Intracoastal Waterway, an inland waterway consisting of natural watercourses and man-made canals, runs between the bay and the Gulf. A majority of the bay's inflow comes from the Trinity River, which contributes  of freshwater annually. The San Jacinto River contributes another . Local coastal watersheds contribute the remainder.

Climate

The climate around the Bay is classified as humid subtropical (Cfa in Köppen climate classification system). Prevailing winds from the south and southeast bring heat from the deserts of Mexico and moisture from the Gulf of Mexico. Summer temperatures regularly exceed , and the area's humidity drives the heat index even higher. Winters in the area are mild, with typical January highs above  and lows above . Snowfall is generally rare.

Hurricanes are an ever-present threat during the fall season. Galveston Island and the Bolivar Peninsula are generally at the greatest risk. However, though the island and the peninsula provide some shielding, the bay shoreline still faces significant danger from storm surge. Hurricane Ike, the most economically and environmentally destructive event on the bay since 1900, struck in 2008. A proposal to build a flood barrier system to prevent against future storm surge, the so-called Ike Dike, has been considered by the state government.

Ecosystem
This unique and complex mixing of waters from different sources provides nursery and spawning grounds for many types of marine life including crabs, shrimp, oysters, and many varieties of fish, thereby supporting a substantial fishing industry. The deeper navigation channels of the bay provide suitable habitats for bottlenose dolphins, which feed on the abundant fish varieties. Additionally, the bayous, rivers, and marshes that ring the bay support their own collection of ecosystems, containing diverse wildlife and enabling freshwater farming of crawfish.

The wetlands that surround the bay support a variety of fauna. Notable terrestrial species include the American alligator and the bobcat, while bird species include the roseate spoonbill, great and snowy egret, white-faced ibis, and mottled duck.

Pollution

In the early 1990s, the Houston Ship Channel had the fifth highest level of toxic chemicals in the nation due to industrial discharge, with over  discharged between 1990 and 1994. However, the bay has generally experienced improving water quality since the passage of the Clean Water Act in 1972. The Houston Area Research Council (HARC) and Galveston Bay Foundation periodically release the Galveston Bay Report Card, which grades a number of metrics indicative of the health of the bay's ecosystem and waters. The 2019 report assigned a "C" grade for toxins in bay sediments, citing water and soil pollution, wildlife habitat loss, and the impacts of climate change as challenges facing the estuary. The presence of the San Jacinto Pits Superfund site in the Houston Ship Channel, which contains large amounts of dioxin, is considered a significant threat to the bay's health. The entire bay is covered by seafood consumption advisories set by the Texas Department of State Health Services, but the strictness of these standards varies by location. In the Ship Channel, advisories recommend against the consumption of all fish and blue crab, while in the lower bay, advisories only apply to catfish.

Oil spills are a routine consequence of the industrial activity around Galveston Bay, with hundreds of spills taking place in a typical year. On March 22, 2014, a barge carrying marine fuel oil collided with another ship in the Houston Ship Channel, causing the contents of one of the barge's  tanks to leak into the bay, requiring weeks of cleanup by dozens of boats. Excessive ozone levels can occur due to industrial activities; nearby Houston is ranked among the most ozone-polluted cities in the United States. The industries located along the ship channel are a major cause of ozone pollution.

Industry 

Galveston Bay is located in Greater Houston, which is the fifth largest metropolitan area in the United States, and home to one of the nation's most significant shipping centers. Houston, the nation's fourth largest city, is the economic and cultural center of the region. Important ports served by the bay include the Port of Houston, the Port of Texas City, and the Port of Galveston. The Houston Ship Channel, which connects the Port of Houston to the Gulf, passes through the bay. It is a partially man-made feature created by dredging the Buffalo Bayou, the ship channel subbays, and Galveston Bay.

The area has a broad industrial base including the energy, manufacturing, aeronautics, transportation, and health care sectors. The bayside communities in particular are home to the Johnson Space Center, which houses the Christopher C. Kraft Jr. Mission Control Center, Ellington Field Joint Reserve Base, Ellington Airport (home of the Houston Spaceport), and a high concentration of petrochemical refineries.

A large commercial fishing industry has grown around Galveston Bay, with significant production of shrimp, blue crab, eastern oyster, black drum, flounder, sheepshead, and snapper.

Galveston Bay supports a significant recreation and tourism industry, especially as a result of its proximity to major population centers. Over 40% of Greater Houston residents participate annually in hiking and swimming along the bay, while 20% go fishing and 15% go boating. The five counties surrounding the bay are home to 88,000 registered pleasure crafts. Fishing expenditures (such as the purchase of fishing bait or lodging) along Galveston Bay and Sabine Lake generate approximately $650 million annually. The recreational fishing industry supports over 3,000 jobs in the bay area.

With over 600 species of birds, Galveston Bay is a popular destination for birdwatching. This sort of ecotourism generates millions in annual revenue for Chambers County, which is home to the Anahuac National Wildlife Refuge and High Island.

See also

List of bays of the Houston area

Notes

References

External links

 Ellender to Galveston Bay, Louisiana—Texas: Intracoastal Waterway Nautical Chart National Ocean Service
 Galveston Bay to Cedar Lakes, Texas: Intracoastal Waterway Nautical Chart National Ocean Service
 See an 1853 map Preliminary chart of San Luis Pass, Texas / from a trigonometrical survey under the direction of A.D. Bache ; triangulation by James S. Williams ; topography by J.M. Wampler ; hydrography by the party under the command of H.S. Stellwagen ; engg. by E. Yeager & J.J. Knight ; redd. drng. by E. Freyhold., hosted by the Portal to Texas History.
Galveston Island State Park
 Galveston Bay Status and Trends
 

Bays of Texas
Estuaries of Texas
Regions of Texas
Bodies of water of Chambers County, Texas
Bodies of water of Galveston County, Texas
Bodies of water of Harris County, Texas